Strip Me is the third studio album by British singer-songwriter Natasha Bedingfield

Strip Me may also refer to:
Strip Me?, album by Anna Tsuchiya
Strip Me (song), a song by Natasha Bedingfield
"Strip Me", song by Suzi Quatro from 1975 album Your Mamma Won't Like Me